Ammar Abadah Nasser al-Wa'eli (1977 in Yemen – 3 June 2011) became wanted in 2002, by the United States Department of Justice's FBI, which was then seeking information about his identity and whereabouts. He was identified as a known associate of the Yemen cell leader, Fawaz Yahya al-Rabeei.

Al-Wa'eli was killed on 3 June 2011 by a US drone strike in Yemen. AQAP confirmed his death one month later.

12 February 2002 terror alert 
On 11 February 2002, Ammar Abadah Nasser al-Wa'eli was named in a suspected Yemen plot, for which he was among 17 suspected terrorists added to the FBI's third major "wanted" list, the "Seeking Information" list.

By February 2003, the FBI removed 6 suspects already jailed rearranged its wanted lists. Al-Wa'eli was one of the remaining eleven Yemen plot suspects. By 2006, al-Wa'eli had been archived and removed from the FBI's current main wanted page, and were no longer included in the official count of suspects.

Whether foiled, aborted, or merely incorrect specific intelligence, the 12 February 2002 attack never occurred. However, other attacks and plots in Yemen soon followed.

Yemeni airstrike 
On 15 January 2010, The New York Times reported that Ammar al-Waeli, "an important arms dealer for Al Qaeda" escaped an airstrike in Yemen which killed "at least five senior members of Al Qaeda’s Arabian branch".

References 

1977 births
2011 deaths
Yemeni people
Date of birth missing